Ibragimovo (İbrahim) is a rural locality (a village) in Zilim-Karanovsky Selsoviet, Gafuriysky District, Bashkortostan, Russia. The population was 340 as of 2010. There are 7 streets.

Geography 
Ibragimovo is located 49 km north of Krasnousolsky (the district's administrative centre) by road. Yulukovo is the nearest rural locality.

References 

Rural localities in Gafuriysky District